Cassey Tereapii Eggelton (born 26 February 1952) is a former Cook Islands politician and Cabinet Minister.

Eggelton was born in Rarotonga and attended Ngatangiia Primary school and Tereora College.  She worked as a hotel manager and has a long association with the Miss Cook Islands Pageant.  In 2003 she was appointed Honorary French Consul to the Cook Islands. In 2004 she was invested with the chefly title Tara’are Mataiapo.

Political career
Eggelton was elected to Parliament as a member of the Democratic Party for the seat of Matavera in the 2006 elections.

Eggelton was initially appointed Deputy Speaker, and was later appointed to the Cabinet of Jim Marurai in March 2010 as Minister for Culture and the Environment.  After she refused to resign from the cabinet following a request, she was expelled from the Democratic Party on 8 April 2010. She failed to win re-election in the 2010 election. She ran again in the 2014 election but was unsuccessful. She failed to win selection as a candidate for the 2018 election.

Eggleton's brother-in-law is Queen's Representative Frederick Tutu Goodwin.

References

External links
 Profile at the Cook Islands Parliament.

1952 births
Living people
People from Rarotonga
Culture ministers of the Cook Islands
Environment ministers of the Cook Islands
Democratic Party (Cook Islands) politicians
Members of the Parliament of the Cook Islands
21st-century New Zealand women politicians
21st-century New Zealand politicians
Women government ministers of the Cook Islands